AsiaWorld–Expo is the western terminus of the  of the Hong Kong MTR. It serves the AsiaWorld–Expo in the northeast corner of Chek Lap Kok, the island on which the Hong Kong International Airport is located.

The AsiaWorld–Expo is an exhibition centre designed to host large scale events located adjacent to Hong Kong International Airport. The Airport Express was extended with a new station at AsiaWorld–Expo to accommodate visitors and organisers.

History 
Tracks were already laid to the site of the AsiaWorld–Expo station when Airport Express inaugurated on 6th July, 1998, but they were originally used as a turn back siding before the station was built. The station opened on 20th December, 2005 together with the exhibition centre, allowing it to be accessible by rail from the central business district and other MTR stations.

Station layout 

Like the other stations on the Airport Express, AsiaWorld–Expo contains platform screen doors. However, the screen doors at this station are different from on other stations of the Airport Express (except the now closed Terminal 2 platforms of Airport station), as they are designed for the trains of Tung Chung line as well, so those trains can also be used to run services from and to the station in order to increase passenger flow when large exhibitions or concerts are being held.

Entrances/exits 
A: AsiaWorld–Expo East Entrance
B: AsiaWorld–Expo West Entrance (opens only during large-scale events)

References 

MTR stations in the New Territories
Airport Express (MTR)
Chek Lap Kok
Railway stations in Hong Kong opened in 2005